Kirkegrenda is a village in the municipality of Rygge in Østfold, Norway. Its population (SSB 2005) is 294.

The village was built up around Rygge Church (Rygge kirke), hence the name Kirkegrenda which means church hamlet. Rygge church is a medieval era church. The church belongs to Vestre Borgesyssel deanery in Diocese of Borg. Rygge church is one of the county's better preserved medieval stone churches. The Romanesque church was built around the year 1170. Rygge church was originally a chapter church, which had income from a larger area than a parish and contained several villages. The building material is stone and brick. The building is characterized by the use of large stones, partly of granite, with parts of the facade carved, including large parts of the north portal. It has long nave and lower and narrower choir. The church was restored in 1967.

Rygge Church Gallery

References

External links
Rygge kirke (kunsthistorie)

Villages in Østfold
Rygge